David and Goliath is a painting of David and Goliath by the seventeenth-century artist Artemisia Gentileschi. 

It is held by a private collection in the United Kingdom. The painting was only identified as being by Artemisia in 2020, after work done by art historian Gianni Papi and restorer Simon Gillespie. The painting features Artemisia's name painted along the blade of David's sword. Previously, the painting was attributed to Giovanni Francesco Guerrieri, a student of Artemisia's father, Orazio Gentileschi. Recent research has indicated that this work was once part of Charles I's collection.

References

1630s paintings
Paintings by Artemisia Gentileschi